Fuglsang may refer to:

 Fuglsang Manor, a 19th-century manor house and former artist retreat on the island of Lolland, Denmark
 Fuglsang Art Museum, an art museum set in rural surroundings on the island of Lolland, Denmark
 Fuglsang (brewery), a brewery in Haderslev, Denmark
 Frederik Fuglsang (1887–1953), Danish cinematographer 
 Jakob Fuglsang (born 1985), Danish professional racing cyclist